Adam Mitchell (born February 16, 1987) is an American professional golfer.

Amateur career 
Mitchell was born in Chattanooga, Tennessee and went to the University of Georgia. During his college golf career, he was a second-team All-American selection, named first-team All-SEC, 2008 Ping Southeast All-Region, posted six top ten finishes in 2008 collegiate golf and was an honorable mention All-American in 2007. He was a member of the winning 2009 American Walker Cup team and competed in the 2008 and 2009 Palmer Cups.

Professional career 
Mitchell turned pro after the 2009 Walker Cup was completed.

Amateur wins
2008 Porter Cup

U.S. national team appearances
Amateur
Walker Cup:  2009 (winners)
Palmer Cup: 2008, 2009

External links 
Yahoo sports profile

American male golfers
Georgia Bulldogs men's golfers
Golfers from Tennessee
Sportspeople from Chattanooga, Tennessee
1987 births
Living people